Vladimir Ilinykh (born May 20, 1975, Severouralsk, Sverdlovsk Oblast) is a Russian political figure and a deputy of 8th State Duma. 

From 1995 to 2012, he was engaged in business. On March 4, 2012, he was elected deputy of the Duma of the Severouralsky Urban Okrug. In December of the same year, he left the post to become First Deputy Head of Administration of the Severouralsky Urban Okrug. From May 2014 to December 2016, he headed the administration. On September 18, 2016, he was elected deputy of the Legislative Assembly of Sverdlovsk Oblast. On February 6, 2020, he was elected the head of Orenburg. Since September 2021, he has served as the deputy of the 8th State Duma from the Orenburg Oblast constituency.

He is one of the members of the State Duma the United States Treasury sanctioned on 24 March 2022 in response to the 2022 Russian invasion of Ukraine.

References

1975 births
Living people
United Russia politicians
21st-century Russian politicians
Eighth convocation members of the State Duma (Russian Federation)
Russian individuals subject to the U.S. Department of the Treasury sanctions